Krasno Selo is a Sofia Metro station. It was opened on 26 August 2020 as part of the inaugural section of the line, from Hadzhi Dimitar to Krasno Selo. It is located between Ovcha kupel and Bulgaria stations.

Location
The station is located at the intersection of Tsar Boris III blvd. and Zhitnitsa Street in Krasno Selo microdistrict. It is 22 meters deep. Only the Orlov Most and NDK 2 stations are deeper than it on Line 3. The entrances are from the four corners of the crossroads - two on the south side of the sidewalk to Gotse Delchev blvd and two from the north - from Zhitnitsa str on the sidewalk of Tsar Boris III blvd. A large, spacious entrance hall offers magnificent views of the platform. On the ceiling above the vestibule, blue wings spread wide, creating the feeling of space, sky and flight in the heights. Road tunnel above the station in the direction of Gоtse Delchev blvd and Zhitnitsa str assists in the conflict-free crossing of cars in this direction with Tsar Boris III Blvd. All entrances to the station are equipped with 5 elevators and 9 escalators. The architect is Krasen Andreev. The layout is solved by polished granite tiles in two colors - beige and light blue in combination with a broken orange strip 1 m thick of tempered glass. 16 transparent opening partitions between the platforms and the trains are 1.6 m high with a stainless edging structure and 40 cm strips of smooth stainless steel at the bottom.

References

Sofia Metro stations
2020 establishments in Bulgaria
Railway stations opened in 2020